is a biography series produced by Tsuburaya Productions created to commemorate the 50th anniversary of Ultra Seven. This show follows a format similar to Ultraman Retsuden, and continues to feature Ultraman Zero as the show's main navigator, bringing the viewers to movies and miniseries that featured his major involvement. Before its official airing in 2017 in Japan, it was shown in Malaysian television channel Astro Ceria starting from April 10, 2015 in Malay.

The show was broadcast starting January 7, 2017 on two Japanese television networks, TV Tokyo and BS Japan at the time of 9:00 am and 5:00 pm respectively. The official website also announced the launch of Ultra Fight Orb, a spinoff of Ultraman Orb which was released in spring 2017.

On July 25, 2017, Toku announced that the series would air in the United States on its channel with English subtitles beginning August 31, 2017.

Characters
: The series' main navigator.

Devices
: Ultraman Orb's transformation device, which made a cameo appearance in the first episode, triggering the announcement "special!" when scanning a peculiar card featuring both Zero and Orb Origin himself.
: A tablet-like device that featured each character's viewpoint, foreshadowing the next episode itself.

Episodes

Ultra Heroes Chronicle
As a countdown to the film Ultraman Orb The Movie,  aired during the ending segment of episodes 7-11 of the show. Ultraman Zero navigates the viewers to the four Ultra Warriors who are featured in the film.
: during episode 7.
: during episode 8.
: during episode 9.
: during episodes 10 and 11.

Ultra Fight Orb

 aired during the ending segment of episodes 15-22 of the show and features two new forms of Ultraman Orb.

Cast
Ultraman Zero (Voice): 
Orb Ring Voice (1): 
: 
: 
: 
: 
: 
Narration: ,

Song

Lyrics: 
Composition & Arrangement: 
Artist:  with

References

External links
Ultraman Zero The Chronicle at TV Tokyo 

2017 Japanese television series debuts
Ultra television series
TV Tokyo original programming
2017 Japanese television series endings